Reiherbach is a river of Hesse, Germany. It is a tributary of the Edersee near Waldeck.

See also
List of rivers of Hesse

Rivers of Hesse
Rivers of Germany